Ibrahim Basit (born 13 October 1990) is a Ghanaian footballer who plays for Al Nahda Club in Oman's OPL.
http://www.opl.om/nahda

References

1990 births
Living people
Ghanaian footballers
Bnei Sakhnin F.C. players
Hapoel Petah Tikva F.C. players
Hapoel Be'er Sheva F.C. players
Maccabi Umm al-Fahm F.C. players
Hapoel Nof HaGalil F.C. players
Israeli Premier League players
Liga Leumit players
Association football forwards